A humorist (American English) or humourist (British English) is an intellectual who uses humor in writing or public speaking. Humorists are distinct from comedians, who are show business entertainers whose business is to make an audience laugh, though it is possible for some persons to occupy both roles in the course of their careers.

Despite the fact that the Kennedy Center for the Performing Arts annually bestows a Mark Twain Prize for American Humor (usually on comedians) since 1998, this award does not by itself qualify the recipient as a humorist.  only two recipients, Steve Martin and Neil Simon, are known as humorists, being humorous playwrights.

List

Notable humorists include:
 Renowned polymath Benjamin Franklin (1706–1790), as a newspaper editor and printer, became one of America's first humorists, most famously for Poor Richard's Almanack published under the pen name "Richard Saunders".
 Seba Smith (1792–1868) American writer and editor, most famous for his editorial character, Jack Downing.
 John Neal (1793–1876) American critic, activist, lecturer, and writer who played a pivotal role in the development of satirical and humorous short stories between the 1820s and 1840s.
 Oscar Wilde (1854–1900) Irish poet and playwright known for his biting wit.
 Kajetan Abgarowicz (1856–1909) Armenian-Polish journalist, novelist and short story writer.
 Sholom Aleichem (1859–1916) pen name of the leading Yiddish author and playwright Solomon Naumovich Rabinovich, on whose stories the musical Fiddler on the Roof was based.
 Jerome K. Jerome (1859–1927) English writer and humorist, best known for the comic travelogue Three Men in a Boat.
 Ring Lardner (1885–1933) was a sports columnist and short story writer best known for his satirical writings about sports, marriage, and the theatre.
 George Ade (1866–1944) American writer and newspaper columnist.
 Robert Benchley (1889–1945) best known for his work as a newspaper columnist and film actor, began writing humorously for The Harvard Lampoon while attending Harvard University, and for many years wrote essays and articles for Vanity Fair and The New Yorker.
 H. L. Mencken (1880–1956) journalist, satirist, cultural critic and scholar of American English. Known as the "Sage of Baltimore", he is regarded as one of the most influential American writers and prose stylists of the first half of the 20th century.  He commented widely on the social scene, literature, music, prominent politicians and contemporary movements. He is known for dubbing the Scopes trial "the Monkey Trial".
 James Thurber (1894–1961) cartoonist, author, journalist, playwright, and celebrated wit, best known for his cartoons and short stories published mainly in The New Yorker.
 Dorothy Parker (1893–1967) writer for Vanity Fair, Vogue and other magazines, playwright, and a close friend of Benchley, was known for her biting, satirical wit.
 Bennett Cerf (1898–1971) one of the founders of the publishing firm Random House, known for his own compilations of jokes and puns, for regular personal appearances lecturing across the United States, and for his television appearances on the panel game show What's My Line?
 P. G. Wodehouse (1881–1975) one of the most widely read humorists of the 20th century.
 Erma Bombeck (1927–1996) newspaper columnist and writer of 15 books who specialized in humorously describing midwestern suburban home life.
 Douglas Adams (1952–2001) English author.
 Art Buchwald (1925–2007) wrote a political satire op-ed column for The Washington Post, which was nationally syndicated in many newspapers.
 Alan Coren (1938–2007) could be considered the English equivalent of Bennett Cerf: a writer and satirist who was well known as a regular panelist on the BBC radio quiz The News Quiz and a team captain on BBC television's Call My Bluff. Coren was also a journalist, and for almost a decade was the editor of Punch magazine.
 Moin Akhter (1950–2011) Pakistani TV and radio comedian.
 Tom Sharpe (1928–2013) satirical novelist, best known for his Wilt series, as well as Porterhouse Blue and  Blott on the Landscape.
 Terry Pratchett (1948–2015) author known for comic fantasy novels, most notably the Discworld series of 41 novels. He was strongly influenced by Wodehouse, Sharpe, Jerome, Coren, and Twain.
 Woody Allen (born 1935) American comedian, writer for The New Yorker.
 Garrison Keilor (born 1942) author, storyteller, voice actor, and radio personality, best known as the creator and host of the Minnesota Public Radio (MPR) show A Prairie Home Companion from 1974 to 2016. He created the fictional Minnesota town Lake Wobegon, the setting of many of his books. He created and voiced the hardboiled detective parody character Guy Noir on his radio show.
 Fran Lebowitz (born 1950) writes sardonic social commentary from a New York City point of view.
 Scott Adams (born 1957) American cartoonist and author.
 Henry Alford (born 1962) American journalist and writer.
 Steve Martin comedian turned playwright.
 Neil Simon humorous playwright.

References 

Lists of writers